is the eighth single by Japanese band Antic Cafe. The initial track is featured on the Magnya Carta album. The song peaked at No. 42 on the Japanese singles chart.

Track listing

 "Maple Gunman" (メープルガンマン)
 "Koukai" (校廻～koukai～)
 "Funky Fresh Days "

References

2006 singles
Loop Ash Records singles
2006 songs